Coral Square, often referred to as Coral Square Mall, is a regional enclosed shopping mall located northwest of Fort Lauderdale in Coral Springs, Florida, on the northeast corner of Atlantic Boulevard and University Drive; it opened in 1984. Originally developed by Eddie Debartolo of DeBartolo Realty, it is currently managed by Simon Property Group, which owns 97.2%, having fallen to Simon following the 1996 merger of Simon and DeBartolo Realty into Simon DeBartolo Group. The anchor stores are 2 Macy's locations, JCPenney, and Kohl's, along with 120 shops and eateries.

History
The mall opened on October 3, 1984 as part of a growth spurt in western Broward, with three department stores: Burdines, Lord & Taylor, and JCPenney. These were followed by Jordan Marsh a year later. The mall is almost identical to Boynton Beach Mall (where they opened in that same year) and The Florida Mall, among other DeBartolo properties. Then, in 1989, Sears joined as the fifth anchor filling the northeast side of the complex. This brought the store count at the mall up to over 130 stores and the amount of anchor stores to five. No other mall in Broward County had five anchors at the time except for The Galleria at Fort Lauderdale, and eventually Pembroke Lakes Mall (1992). Shortly after, store consolidations and acquisitions have started varying the anchor line-up over the years. First, in 1991, Lord & Taylor was converted to Mervyn's and Jordan Marsh was rebranded as a Burdines men's, children's, and home store. The mall was first renovated in 1995, but has never been expanded aside from the aforementioned addition of Sears. Mervyn's withdrew from Florida in 1997, thus the store switched to Dillard's (which had its only area stores at Galleria and Pembroke Lakes at that time, followed by The Mall at Wellington Green in 2001). Then, Burdines merged with Macy's in 2003, so the two stores at the mall simply became Macy's in 2005. Then came another renovation in late 2008, and Dillard's later transitioned into a Kohl's, which opened September 28, 2011. In many of these aspects, the mall developed a similar fashion to Boynton Beach and Miami International malls.

On November 26, 2016, a shop owner shot and wounded an employee, then turned the gun on himself and killed himself. Coral Springs Fire Department took the wounded to a nearby hospital, where they were expected to be ok. The mall was closed for the morning then reopened later in the afternoon with heavily armed Coral Springs Police Officers.

On February 8, 2020, it was announced that Sears would be closing as part of a plan to close 39 stores nationwide. The store closed in April 2020. A contract with Round 1 Entertainment was pending as well, as with Pembroke Lakes.

Anchors

Current Anchors
JCPenney (since October 3, 1984)
Kohl's (since September 28, 2011)
Macy's (2 locations) (since March 6, 2005)

Former Anchors
Burdines (2 locations):
(Original store) (September 16, 1984-March 6, 2005) 
(Men's, Children's, Home) (October 1991-March 6, 2005)
Dillard's (October 16, 1997-December 15, 2010)
Jordan Marsh (August 24, 1985-September 30, 1991)
Lord & Taylor (October 1, 1984-January 19, 1991)
Mervyn's (July 15, 1991-April 1997)
Sears (November 15, 1989-April 12, 2020)

References

External links
 Coral Square official website

Shopping malls in Broward County, Florida
Shopping malls established in 1984
Simon Property Group
Buildings and structures in Coral Springs, Florida
1984 establishments in Florida